Sultanganj railway station (Code:SGG) is a railway station in the Bhagalpur district. Sultanganj railway station comes under the Malda railway division of the Eastern Railway Zone, Indian Railways.

References

External links 

Railway stations in Bhagalpur district
Malda railway division